Asherah in ancient Semitic religion, is a fertility goddess who appears in a number of ancient sources. She also appears in Hittite writings as Ašerdu(s) or Ašertu(s). Her name is sometimes rendered Athirat in the context of her cult at Ugarit.

Significance and roles
Asherah is identified as the consort of the Sumerian god Anu, and Ugaritic ʾEl, the oldest deities of their respective pantheons. This role gave her a similarly high rank in the Ugaritic pantheon. Deuteronomy 12 has Yahweh commanding the destruction of her shrines so as to maintain purity of his worship. The name Dione, which like ʾElat means "goddess", is clearly associated with Asherah in the Phoenician History of Sanchuniathon, because the same common epithet (ʾElat) of "the Goddess par excellence" was used to describe her at Ugarit. The Book of Jeremiah, written circa 628 BC, possibly refers to Asherah when it uses the title "queen of heaven" in Jeremiah 7:16–18 and Jeremiah 44:17–19, 25.

In Eastern Semitic texts
In Ugaritic texts, Asherah appears as ʾAṯirat (Ugaritic: 𐎀𐎘𐎗𐎚), anglicised Athirat. Sources from before 1200 BC almost always credit Athirat with her full title rbt ʾṯrt ym (or rbt ʾṯrt). The phrase occurs 12 times in the Baʿal Epic alone. The title rbt is most often vocalised as rabītu, although rabat and rabīti are sometimes used by scholars. Apparently of Akkadian origin, rabītu means "lady" (literally "female great one"). She appears to champion her son, Yam, god of the sea, in his struggle against Baʾal. Yam's ascription as god of the sea in the English translation is somewhat misleading, however, as yām is a common western Semitic root that literally means "sea". Consequently, one should understand Yam to be the deified sea itself rather than a deity who holds dominion over it. Athirat's title can therefore been translated as "Lady ʾAṯirat of the Sea", alternatively, "she who walks on the sea", or even "the Great Lady-who-tramples-Yam". A suggestion in 2010 by a scholar is that the name Athirat might be derived from a passive participle form, referring to the "one followed by (the gods)", that is, "pro-genitress or originatress", which would correspond to Asherah's image as the "mother of the gods" in Ugaritic literature.

Certain translators and commentators theorise that Athirat's name is from the Ugaritic root ʾaṯr, "to stride", a cognate of the Hebrew root ʾšr, of the same meaning. Alternative translations of her title have been tendered that follow this suggested etymology, such as "she who treads on the sea dragon",  or "she who treads on Tyre"—the former of which appears to be an attempt to grant the Ugaritic texts a type of Chaoskampf (struggle against Chaos). A more recent analysis of this epithet has resulted in the proposition of a radically different translation, namely "Lady Asherah of the day", or, more simply, "Lady Day". The common Semitic root ywm (for reconstructed Proto-Semitic *yawm-), from which derives, meaning "day", appears in several instances in the Masoretic Texts with the second-root letter (-w-) having been dropped, and in a select few cases, replaced with an A-class vowel of the Niqqud, resulting in the word becoming y(a)m. Such occurrences, as well as the fact that the plural, "days", can be read as both yōmîm and yāmîm, gives credence to this alternate translation.

Another primary epithet of Athirat was qnyt ʾilm, which may be translated as "the creatrix of the deities". In those texts, Athirat is the consort of the god ʾEl; there is one reference to the 70 sons of Athirat, presumably the same as the 70 sons of ʾEl. Among the Hittites this goddess appears as Ašerdu(s) or Ašertu(s), the consort of Elkunirsa ("El, the Creator of Earth") and mother of either 77 or 88 sons. Within the Amarna letters is found reference to a king of the Amorites by the name of Abdi-Ashirta, "servant of Asherah".

In the Ugaritic sources she is also called ʾElat, "goddess", the feminine form of ʾEl (compare Allāt); she is also called Qodeš, "holiness", in these sources.

In Akkadian texts, Asherah appears as Aširatu; though her exact role in the pantheon is unclear; as a separate goddess, Antu, was considered the wife of Anu, the god of Heaven. In contrast, ʿAshtart is believed to be linked to the Mesopotamian goddess Ishtar who is sometimes portrayed as the daughter of Anu while in Ugaritic myth, ʿAshtart is one of the daughters of ʾEl, the West Semitic counterpart of Anu. Several Akkadian sources also preserve what are considered to be Amorite theophoric names which use Asherah—usually appearing as Aširatu or Ašratu.

In Egyptian sources

Beginning during the Eighteenth Dynasty of Egypt, a Semitic goddess named Qetesh ("holiness", sometimes reconstructed as Qudshu) appears prominently. That dynasty follows expulsion of occupying foreigners from an intermediary period. Some think this deity is Athirat/Ashratu under her Ugaritic name. This Qetesh seems not to be either ʿAshtart or ʿAnat as both those goddesses appear under their own names and with quite different iconography, yet is called "Qudshu-Astarte-Anat" in at least one pictorial representation, aptly named the "Triple Goddess Stone".

In the Persian, Hellenistic, and Roman periods in Egypt, however, there was a strong tendency of syncretism toward goddesses, and Athirat/Ashratum then seems to have disappeared, at least as a prominent goddess under a recognizable name.

Religious scholar Saul M. Olyan (author of Asherah and the Cult of Yahweh in Israel) calls the representation on the Qudshu-Astarte-Anat plaque "a triple-fusion hypostasis", and considers Qudshu to be an epithet of Athirat by a process of elimination, for Astarte and Anat appear after Qudshu in the inscription.

In Israel and Judah
Between the tenth century BC and the beginning of their Babylonian exile in 586 BC, polytheism was normal throughout Israel. Worship solely of Yahweh became established only after the exile, and possibly, only as late as the time of the Maccabees (2nd century BC). That is when monotheism became universal among the Jews. Some biblical scholars believe that Asherah at one time was worshipped as the consort of Yahweh, the national god of Israel. 

There are references to the worship of numerous deities throughout the Books of Kings: Solomon builds temples to many deities and Josiah is reported as cutting down the statues of Asherah in the temple Solomon built for Yahweh (2 Kings 23:14). Josiah's grandfather Manasseh had erected one such statue (2 Kings 21:7).

Further evidence for Asherah-worship includes, for example, an eighth-century BC combination of iconography and inscriptions discovered at Kuntillet Ajrud in the northern Sinai desert where a storage jar shows three anthropomorphic figures and several inscriptions. The inscriptions found refer not only to Yahweh but to ʾEl and Baʿal, and two include the phrases "Yahweh of Samaria and his Asherah" and "Yahweh of Teman and his Asherah." The references to Samaria (capital of the kingdom of Israel) and Teman (in Edom) suggest that Yahweh had a temple in Samaria, while raising questions about the relationship between Yahweh and Kaus, the national god of Edom. The "asherah" in question is most likely a cultic object, although the relationship of this object (a stylised tree perhaps) to Yahweh and to the goddess Asherah, consort of ʾEl, is unclear. It has been suggested that the Israelites may have considered Asherah as the consort of Baʿal, due to the anti-Asherah ideology that was influenced by the  Deuteronomistic Historians, at the later period of the kingdom. Also, it has been suggested by several scholars  that there is a relationship between the position of the gəḇīrā in the royal court and the worship (orthodox or not) of Asherah. In a potsherd inscription of blessings from "Yahweh and his Asherah", there appears a cow feeding its calf. Numerous Canaanite amulets depict a woman wearing a bouffant wig similar to the Egyptian Hathor. If Asherah is then to be associated with Hathor/Qudshu, it can then be assumed that the cow is being referred to as Asherah.

William Dever's book Did God Have a Wife? adduces further archaeological evidence—for instance, the many female figurines unearthed in ancient Israel, (known as pillar-base figurines)—as supporting the view that during Israelite folk religion of the monarchical period, Asherah functioned as a goddess and a consort of Yahweh and was worshiped as the queen of heaven, for whose festival the Hebrews baked small cakes. Dever also points to the discovery of multiple shrines and temples within ancient Israel and Judah. The temple site at Arad is particularly interesting for the presence of two (possibly three) massebot, standing stones representing the presence of deities. Although the identity of the deities associated with the massebot is uncertain, Yahweh and Asherah or Asherah and Baal remain strong candidates, as Dever notes: "The only goddess whose name is well attested in the Hebrew Bible (or in ancient Israel generally) is Asherah."

The name Asherah appears forty times in the Hebrew Bible, but it is much reduced in English translations. The Vulgate in Latin provided lucus or nemus, a grove or a wood. From the Vulgate, the King James translation of the Bible uses grove or groves instead of Asherah's name. Non-scholarly English language readers of the Bible would not have read her name for more than 400 years afterward. The association of Asherah with trees in the Hebrew Bible is very strong. For example, she is found under trees (1 Kings 14:23; 2 Kings 17:10) and is made of wood by human beings (1 Kings 14:15, 2 Kings 16:3–4). Trees described as being an asherah or part of an asherah include grapevines, pomegranates, walnuts, myrtles, and willows.

Worship and suppression 
Episodes in the Hebrew Bible show a gender imbalance in Hebrew religion. Asherah was patronized by female royals such as the Queen Mother Maacah (1 Kings 15:13). But more commonly, perhaps, Asherah was worshiped within the household and her offerings were performed by family matriarchs. As the women of Jerusalem attested, "When we burned incense to the Queen of Heaven and poured out drink offerings to her, did not our husbands know that we were making cakes impressed with her image and pouring out drink offerings to her?" (Jeremiah 44:19). This passage corroborates a number of archaeological excavations showing altar spaces in Hebrew homes. The "household idols" variously referred to in the Bible may also be linked to the hundreds of female pillar-base figurines that have been discovered.

Jezebel brought hundreds of prophets for Baal and Asherah with her into the Israelite court.

Popular culture defines Canaanite religion and Hebrew idolatry as sexual "fertility cults," products of primitive superstition rather than spiritual philosophy. This position is buttressed by the Hebrew Bible, which frequently and graphically associates goddess religions with prostitution. As Jeremiah wrote, "On every high hill and under every spreading tree you lay down as a prostitute" (Jeremiah 2:20). Hosea, Jeremiah, and Ezekiel in particular blame the goddess religions for making Yahweh "jealous", and cite his jealousy as the reason Yahweh allowed the destruction of Jerusalem. As for sexual and fertility rites, it is likely that once they were held in honor in Israel, as they were throughout the ancient world. Although their nature remains uncertain, sexual rites typically revolved around women of power and influence, such as Maacah. The Hebrew term qadishtu, usually translated as "temple prostitutes" or "shrine prostitutes", literally means "priestesses" or "priests". However, there is a growing consensus that sacred prostitution never existed.

Iconography 
Some scholars have found an early link between Asherah and Eve, based upon the coincidence of their common title as "the mother of all living" in the Book of Genesis 3:20 through the identification with the Hurrian mother goddess Hebat. There is further speculation that the Shekhinah as a feminine aspect of Yahweh, may be a cultural memory or devolution of Asherah. 

In Christian scripture, the Holy Spirit is represented by a dove—a ubiquitous symbol of goddess religions, also found on Hebrew naos shrines. This speculation is not widely accepted. Goddess symbology nevertheless persists in Christian iconography; Israel Morrow notes that while Christian art typically displays female angels with avian wings, the only biblical reference to such figures comes through Zechariah's vision of pagan goddesses.

Ugaritic amulets show a miniature "tree of life" growing out of Asherah's belly. Accordingly, Asherah poles, which were sacred trees or poles, are mentioned many times in the Hebrew Bible, rendered as palus sacer (sacred poles) in the Latin Vulgate. Asherah poles were prohibited by the Deuteronomic Code that commanded "You shall not plant any tree as an Asherah beside the altar of the Lord your God". The prohibition, as Dever notes, is also a testament to the practice of putting up Asherah poles beside Yahweh's altars (cf. 2 Kings 21:7) amongst Israelites. Another significant biblical reference occurs in the legend of Deborah, a female ruler of Israel who held court under a sacred tree (Book of Judges 4:5), which was preserved for many generations. Morrow further notes that the "funeral pillars of the kings" described by the Book of Ezekiel (43:9, variously translated as "funeral offerings" or even "carcasses of the kings") were likely constructed of sacred wood, since the prophet connects them with "prostitution."

The lioness made a ubiquitous symbol for goddesses of the ancient Middle East that was similar to the dove and the tree. Lionesses figure prominently in Asherah's iconography, including the tenth century BC Ta'anach cult stand, which also includes the tree motif. A Hebrew arrowhead from eleventh century BC bears the inscription "Servant of the Lion Lady".

In Arabia
As ʾAṯirat she was attested in pre-Islamic south Arabia as the consort of the moon-god ʿAmm.

One of the Tema stones (CIS II 113) discovered by Charles Huber in 1883 in the ancient oasis of Tema, northwestern Arabia, and now located at the Louvre, believed to date to the time of Nabonidus's retirement there in 549 BC, bears an inscription in Aramaic that mentions Ṣelem of Maḥram, Šingalāʾ, and ʾAšîrāʾ as the deities of Tema. This ʾAšîrāʾ may be Asherah. It is unclear whether the name would be an Aramaic vocalisation of the Ugaritic ʾAṯirat or a later borrowing of the Hebrew ʾĂšērāh or similar form. In any event, the root of both names is a Proto-Semitic *ʾṯrt.

The Arabic root ʾṯr (as in  ʾaṯar',' "trace") is similar in meaning to the Hebrew ʾāšar, indicating "to tread", used as a basis to explain Asherah's epithet "of the sea" as "she who treads the sea" (especially as the Arabic root  yamm also means "sea"). Recently, it has been suggested that the goddess name Athirat might be derived from the passive participle form, referring to "one followed by (the gods)", that is, "pro-genitress or originatress", corresponding with Asherah's image as the "mother of the gods" in Ugaritic literature.

See also

Explanatory notes

Citations

General sources 
 
 
 
 
 
 
 
 
 .
 
 
 
 .
 
 .

External links

Asherah
 Asphodel P. Long, The Goddess in Judaism – An Historical Perspective
 Asherah, the Tree of Life and the Menorah
 Jewish Encyclopedia: Asherah
 Rabbi Jill Hammer, An Altar of Earth: Reflections on Jews, Goddesses and the Zohar
 University of Birmingham: Deryn Guest: Asherah at Archive.org
 Lilinah biti-Anat, Qadash Kinahnu Deity Temple "Room One, Major Canaanite Deities"

Kuntillet ʿAjrud inscriptions
 Jacques Berlinerblau, "Official religion and popular religion in pre-Exilic ancient Israel" (Commentary on Yahweh's Asherah.)
 ANE: Kuntillet bibliography
 Jeffrey H. Tigay, "A Second Temple Parallel to the Blessings from Kuntillet Ajrud" (University of Pennsylvania) (This equates Asherah with an asherah.)

Israelite
 David Steinberg, Israelite Religion to Judaism: the Evolution of the Religion of Israel

 
Ancient Israel and Judah
Book of Deuteronomy
Book of Jeremiah
Deities in the Hebrew Bible
Fertility goddesses
Levantine mythology
Mother goddesses
Phoenician mythology
West Semitic goddesses
South Arabia
Arabian goddesses
Queens of Heaven (antiquity)
Ugaritic deities